Jacques Azagury is a Moroccan-born fashion designer.

Azagury was born in Morocco, and studied at the London College of Fashion and St Martin's School of Art, before opening his flagship store in London's Knightsbridge in 1987.

Azagury has created clothes for Princess Diana, Helen Mirren and Elizabeth McGovern. Azagury would visit Diana for dress fittings at her apartment in Kensington Palace.

References

Living people
Shoe designers
British fashion designers
Moroccan fashion designers
Moroccan emigrants to England
English people of Moroccan descent
Year of birth missing (living people)